Mutation research may refer to:

 Study of mutation, part of genetics
 Mutation Research (journal), a scientific journal